Kristopher Vida (born 23 June 1995) is a Hungarian professional footballer who plays as a winger for Kisvárda.

Club career

Early career
Vida started his career by joining Goldball FC’s youth team in 2000 at the age of four. He stayed there for five years until he moved to Vasas Budapest. After a four years in the club's youth system, with a short  stint at Videoton FC, he moved to Honvéd Budapest in 2009.

Netherlands 
In 2011, he was signed by Dutch side Twente Enschede after a successful trial. He made his professional debut in the club’s second team playing in Eerste Divisie in 2013. At the end of the season, he changed his club and joined De Graafschap in the second division. In the 2014–15 season, as a starter he helped the club win promotion to the Dutch first division, Eredivisie. Unfortunately, the team did not perform well, resulting in relegation at the end of the 2015–16 season, following which Vida left the club. and Kristopher Vida left the club.

DAC Dunajská Streda 
On 29 June 2016, Vida signed with Slovak Super Liga team DAC Dunajská Streda. His time with Dunaszerdahely started off with some difficulties, but the role and importance of the player changed with Csaba László’s arrival. In his first season in Fortuna League, he scored five goals in 29 matches, contributing to the club's unbeaten run of 17 games.

Piast Gliwice
On 26 February 2020, he signed a three-and-a-half-year deal with defending Polish champions Piast Gliwice. On 9 August 2022, he left the club by mutual consent.

Kisvárda 
On 9 August 2022, Vida returned to Hungary and signed with Kisvárda.

Career statistics

External links
 Official - Facebook

References

1995 births
Footballers from Budapest
Living people
Hungarian footballers
Hungary youth international footballers
Association football midfielders
Vasas SC players
Budapest Honvéd FC players
Jong FC Twente players
FC Twente players
De Graafschap players
FC DAC 1904 Dunajská Streda players
Piast Gliwice players
Kisvárda FC players
Eerste Divisie players
Eredivisie players
Slovak Super Liga players
Ekstraklasa players
Nemzeti Bajnokság I players
Hungarian expatriate footballers
Expatriate footballers in the Netherlands
Expatriate footballers in Slovakia
Expatriate footballers in Poland
Hungarian expatriate sportspeople in the Netherlands
Hungarian expatriate sportspeople in Slovakia
Hungarian expatriate sportspeople in Poland